Hatheli (lit:Palm), is a Pakistani television drama serial that was first aired on 27 September 2016. It aired every Monday and Tuesday at 9:10 replacing Khwab Saraye. Eshal Fayyaz made her second appearance on Hum TV after Abro, opposite Azfar Rehman. After airing 8 episodes, the slot of Hatheli moved to Wednesday and Thursday at 9:10 pm, giving way to Kuch Na Kaho and replacing Deewana from 3 November 2016.

Plot 
Hatheli revolves around Zaib, a young girl who falls in love with Irfan and marries him as per her own choice, although her brother and sister-in-law are against this decision. In a fit of anger, just a few days after their marriage, Irfan verbally divorces Zaib when he finds out that she attempts to find out about his past (his sister Mona had married a Christian and ran away from home). Zaib marries Salman for Nikah halala in order to be able to marry Irfan again. Salman refuses to divorce Zaib. On the other hand, Samia who likes Irfan cunningly marries him. Samia becomes pregnant and Irfan still refuses to accept her.

Cast 
 Hassan Ahmed as Irfan (Salman's & Mona's Older Brother, Zaib's Husband and Naheed's Son)
 Eshal Fayyaz as Zaib (Nadeem's Younger Sister, Shabana's Sister In Law, Salman And Mona's Sister In Law and Irfan's Wife)
 Azfar Rehman as Salman (Mona & Irfan's Younger Brother, Zaib's Brother In Law & later husband and Naheed's Son)
 Rubina Ashraf as Naheed (Salman, Irfan and Mona's mother)
 Kiran Tabeir as Samia (Irfan's neighbour and wife)
 Hira Pervaiz as Mona (Salman And Irfan's Sister, Zaib's Sister In Law and Naheed's Daughter)
 Sajid Shah as Nadeem (Shabana's Husband, Zaib's Elder Brother and Irfan and Saleem's Brother In Law) 
 Adnan Shah Tipu as Saleem (Shabana's Brother and Nadeem's Brother In Law) 
 Fouzia Mushtaq as Saleem and Shabana's mother
 Ismat Iqbal as Samia's mother
 Aish Khan as Shabana (Saleem's Sister, Nadeem's Wife and Zaib's Sister In Law)
 Shahzad Malik
 Taifoor Khan as Kamran (Mona's Husband, Irfan and Salman's Brother In Law and Naheed's Son In Law)
 Azra Mohyeddin as Aapa (Samia's Aapa and tarot cards reader)

Accolades

See also 
 List of programs broadcast by Hum TV
 2016 in Pakistani television

References

External links 
 

Pakistani drama television series
2016 Pakistani television series debuts
2017 Pakistani television series endings
Urdu-language television shows
Hum TV original programming